In fluid dynamics, Howarth–Dorodnitsyn transformation (or Dorodnitsyn-Howarth transformation) is a density-weighted coordinate transformation, which reduces compressible flow conservation equations to simpler form (in most cases, to incompressible form). The transformation was first used by Anatoly Dorodnitsyn in 1942 and later by Leslie Howarth in 1948.

The transformation is extensively used in boundary layer theory and other gas dynamics problems.

Stewartson–Illingworth transformation
Keith Stewartson and C. R. Illingworth, independently introduced in 1949, a transformation that extends the Howarth–Dorodnitsyn transformation. The transformation reads as

where  is the streamwise coordinate,  is the normal coordinate,  denotes the sound speed and  denotes the pressure. For ideal gas, the transformation is defined as

where  is the specific heat ratio.

References

Fluid dynamics